The "Vasnani" and "Purswani" family is a branch of the Bhambrai Bradri grouping of families, which is the largest grouping among the Khudabadi Sonara community. In the present day, the majority of them live in Jaipur, India.

Etymology
The surname Purswani is derived from the name of their ancestor Pursumal, son of Nebhraj Jethmal Bhambrai; the family can be traced back seven generations. The Purswani family falls under the Bhambrai Bradri Nukh Dandi Proll. The words “Dandi Proll” are derived from Dandakaranya.

History

From Lahore to Aror 
The ancestors of the families of Bhambrai Bradri were Lohana, as part of Sindhi Hindu community. Around 1200 BC, this group migrated from Luvana (near modern Lahore) together with some of Shavi Aryas  to Aror (present day Sukkur), in Sindh. They settled near the banks of the Sindhu River and lived there till 962 AD.

From Vedic times till 710 AD, all residents of Sindh were Hindus and Sindh was ruled by the Hindus. In the year 711, Hujjaj Bin Yusif, the Umayyad Governor of Iraq (appointed by Khalifa Walid) sent the Arab forces under Muhammad Bin Qasim to conquer Sindh, in the process of freeing the kidnapped women whose abduction allegation were cast on Bawarij. The first town he attacked was Debal, and upon the orders of Al-Hajjaj he looted its residents or priests and destroyed its temple . He then settled a garrison of four thousand colonists in one quarter of Debal, building a mosque over the remains of the original temple.

From Debal, Muhammad Bin Qasim attacked Nayrun Kot (present day Hyderabad) and the locals, equipped mostly with farming implements, surrendered. King Nayrun was dethroned. The army of Muhammad Bin Qasim looted the trade goods and took over the Hindu worship sites atop the Ganjo Takker ridge, building mosques to replace them. The Nayrun Kot was destroyed. After that, he captured Sadusan (Sehwan). Again, the main temples were razed and mosques were built to replace them, often using their components; additionally one-fifth of the booty including slaves was dispatched to Hajjaj and the Caliph. At Ar-rur (Nawabshah), he defeated Raja Dahir's forces and the eastern [Jats] in the battle. About 6000 Sindhi warriors were put to death. Dahir's wife Ladi committed suttee to escape from the hands of the Muslims. Aror was the capital of Sindh which was ruled by Raja Dahir.  Muhammad bin Qasim won over Raja Dahir and took control of Sindh. His conquest for the Umayyads brought Sindh into the orbit of the Muslim world.

From Qasim on, extracting jizya (a tax on non-Muslims) was a political and religious duty exacted "with vigour and punctuality, and frequently with insult. The native population had to feed every Muslim traveller for three days and nights and had to submit too many other humiliations which are mentioned by Muslim historians." The period of Qasim's rule has been called by U.T. Thakkur "the darkest period in Sindh history", with the records speaking of massive forced conversions, temple destruction, massacres and genocides.

Khudabadi Sonara and some other Hindu Sindhis who refused to convert to Islam yet remained in Sindh were heavily oppressed.  According to Sindhi legend, the Sonaras gathered at temple of the goddess Durga for three days and nights continuously without eating food and drinking water. On fourth day, a miracle occurred: all the men present felt janau (sacred thread) on their bodies and they realised the blessings of Durga Mata. Thereafter, these Khudabadi Sonara became known as Janjogal (janau-wearing) Sonara. These Hindus continued to fight the naibs of the Khalifa and in due course of time they managed to recover a large part of Sindh and ruled over that.

From Aror to Bhambore
In 962 AD, an earthquake struck Sindh, altering the course of the Indus. The ancestors of the families of Bhambrai Bradri shifted their homes from Aror to Bhambore (Bhambore is famously known as Bhambra among Khudabadi Sindhi Swarankar Community). During the ensuing prolonged period of lasting peace after 711 AD when, the families of Bhambrai Bradri as a part of Sindhi Lohana/Khudabadi Sonara could not be supported by the armies and could not find any work as warriors, they turned to peacetime occupations and became cloth merchants as the means of their livelihood in Bhambore.

About the 10th century Bhambore was the capital of a chief Bhambo Raja and was named Bhambore after him. Bhambore was the ruins of the ancient port city of Debal, located near modern Karachi at the base of the Indus River, approximately 60 km between Dhabeji and Gharo. Its population was mainly Hindus with a Buddhist minority. It is largely known for the ruins of a castle destroyed by Muhammad bin Qasim during the invasion of Sindh. According to modern archaeologists Debal was founded in the 1st century AD, and soon became the most important trading city in Sindh. The city was home to thousands of Sindhi Sailors including the Bawarij (a Muslim Sindhi community). Ibn Hawqal mentions the dry arid land surrounding the city that supported little agriculture, he mentions how efficiently the inhabitants of the city maintained fishing vessels and trade.

Bhambore was the trading link between Arab and South Asian nations of its times. It was most important fort because of trade communication and security. According to Berzin, Umayyad interest in the region stemmed from their desire to control the trade route down the Indus River valley to the seaports of Sindh, an important link in the ancient Silk Road. At that time, Sindh was the wild frontier region ruled by Raja Dahir who also wanted to control the Western Indian Ocean. Muslim sources insist that it was these persistent activities along increasingly important Indian trade routes by Debal pirates (Bawarij) and others which forced the Arabs to subjugate the area, in order to control the seaports and maritime routes of which Sindh was the nucleus, as well as, the overland passage. In 711 AD Muhammad Bin Qasim entered Sindh by first assaulting and capturing Debal Fort, presently known as Bhambore.

Debal and the Manora Island were visited by Ottoman Admiral Sevdi Ali Reis and mentioned in his book Mirát ul Memalik in 1554. In 1568, Debal was attacked by the Portuguese Admiral Fernão Mendes Pinto in an attempt to capture or destroy the Ottoman vessels anchored there. Pinto also claims that Sindhi sailors joined the Ottoman admiral Kurtoglu Hizir Reis on his voyage to Aceh. Debal was also visited by the British travel writers such as Thomas Postans and Eliot, who is noted for his vivid account on the city of Thatta.

From Bhambore (Bhambra) to Lakhpat (Kutch)

Members of Bhambrai Bradri (the ancestors of Purswani family) also left Bhambore and settled in Lakhpat around 1200 AD and continued with their occupation as cloth merchants. This is said to be due to the invasions of Mahmoud Ghaznavi.

From Lakhpat (Kutch) to Bhambore (Bhambra) and Khudabad

The Sammas, a Rajput tribes, which was ruling Kutch, gained control of Thatta in the southern Sindh from the Soomras around 1351, and expanded their territory northward to Bhakkar and beyond.  Around that time, the Khudabadi Sonara Community  started returning to their home towns (Bhambore, Tando & Nayrun Kot etc.), and some of them settled on a "empty land" on the banks of Sindhu River near Dadu, in Sindh. Members of Khudabadi Sonara Community developed the empty land and called it "Khud-Abad" Later, due to Muslim domination, the Khud-Abad was renamed as Khudabad, a Muslim name. Families of Bhambrai Bradri (the ancestors of Purswani Family) returned to their home town Bhambore around 1400 AD. They are called Bhambrai Bradri because they lived in Bhambore for many centuries (before migration to Lakhpat around 1200 AD and after returning from Lakhpat). Bhambore was later abandoned due to a change in the river's course. Evidence of earthquakes and regional invaders is also cited as an explanation for the population's movement away from the area and the crumbling of the castle. The former river delta is now a creek. And later, they shifted to Khudabad  around  1700 AD. They changed their business from cloth merchants to jewelry and goldsmith business while living in Khudabad. Khudabadi Sonara invented Khudabadi Script for Sindhi Language around 1750 AD while living in Khudabad. It is called Khudabadi Script because it was invented in Khudabad. It was later known as Vaniki, Hatvaniki and Hatkai. Mian Noor Mohammad Kalhoro, who became the ruler of Sindh (1720–1755), then, chose Khudabad as his capital. The Khudabad was capital of Sindh between 1720 and 1783.

From Khudabad to Hyderabad (Sindh)

After the defeat of Kalhoras (Mian Abdul Nabi Kalhora), and extensive flooding of the River Sindh, Mir Fateh Ali Khan (Talpur) left his capital Khudabad and made Hyderabad his capital in 1789. Great celebrations were held in 1792 to mark his formal entry in Hyderabad fort. He made the Pako Qilo his residence, which was spread over thirty-six acres, and he held his courts there. The change of capital induced a large number of the population of Khudabad to migrate to Hyderabad, the new seat of royalty. The families of Bhambrai Bradri along with the other families of the Sonara community, Amils and Bhaibands, who had lived and worked in Khudabad, shifted to Hyderabad with the rulers, They retained the term Khudabadi in the names of their communities as an identifier of their origin and called themselves "Khudabadi Sonaras", "Khudabadi Amils" and "Khudabadi Bhaibands".

The Bhambrai Bradri lived in Gidwani Ghitti(ghitti means lane) in Hyderabad. At that time, the head of Bhambrai Bradri was Paripyomal Bhambrai, also known as "Bhai Sitaldas Bhambrai". He had a son, Jethmal Bhambrai, who was born around 1789 in Khudabad before they moved to Hyderabad.

Jethmal Bhambrai had friendly relations with Diwan Tarachand Sagharani, then Mukhi of Amil Panchayat in Hyderabad. The Battle of Miani ended on 24 March 1843, where the last Talpur rulers, Mir Mohammad Naseers Khan Talpur of Hyderabad and Mir Sher Muhammad Talpur of Mirpur lost to the British General Sir Charles James Napier and the cities of Hyderabad and Mirpur came into the hands of the British East India Company. Mukhi Tarachand Sagharani and other residents of Hyderabad feared reprisal and apprehended lootings from the hands of the British forces. Sagharani, along with Mukhi Chandumal of the Khudabadi Sonara, Jethmal Bhambrai (the ancestor of Purswani Family), and three other elders of Hyderabad City met Napier and pleaded with him to confine his forces to barracks and not to allow them to enter the city. The residents of Hyderabad undertook to provide them with food and other rations that the British forces needed and deliver it to them in their camp. Sir Charles conceded to their request, and the British forces remained outside the city. The residents of Hyderabad provided the rations and Amil Panchayat footed the bill.

Later, Sir Charles Napier met Mukhi Tarachand Sagharani and others in his camp at Gidu Bunder and thanked them for their farsightedness, and for the food that they had supplied. This information was disclosed to Diwan Bherumal Meharchand Advani by Mukhi Mangharam Gurdinomal and was on records in the India Office, London. Diwan Bherumal Meharchand Advani further writes that it was learnt from records maintained by Pinda Badaldas Bulchand of Sindhi Dharamshala Haridwar, that wife of Amil Mukhi Tarachand Sagharani expired in the year 1835 and Mukhi Assanand along with Jethmal Bhambrai served as kandhi [pallbearer](Kandhi words relates to kandh meaning area between neck & shoulder on which kandhi supports the "Kaai"), for his wife, carrying her ashes for performing the last rites at Haridwar. At that time Kumbh Mela was in progress.

Surname change
Jethmal Bhambrai had two sons, naming Nebhraj (born around 1814 AD) and Aainomal. Nebhraj had four sons naming Pursumal, Motoomal, Hassrajmal and Assandas whereas, Aainomal had one son naming Mangatram. Respected Mangatram had two sons naming Gunomal and Udhanmal. The surname of whole family was Jethmalani. Around the year 1910, the descendants of Pursumal changed their surname to Purswani, those of Motoomal changed to Motwani, those of Hassrajmal changed to Hasrajani, those of Gunomal changed to Ganvani and those of Udhanmal changed to Udhani. Assandas had a daughter named chupi but no son as such there was no further extension of the family of Assandas. All these groups have been maintaining their respective surnames since then. At the same time, all the families have also retained “Bhambrai” as the name of their Bradri, signifying that their ancestors had lived in Bhambore many centuries ago.

Pursumal had four sons (Lalchand, Narumal, Jeumal, Fatumal and Bhojraj). In the year 1910, there were further splits in families; the descendants of Purswani family such as Lalchand, Narumal, Fatumal separated whereas Jeumal and Bhojraj remained together (the wives of Jeumal and Bhojraj were sisters). By this time, the members of Motwani family and Hasrajani family moved out from the joint residence in Gidwani Ghitti but the members of Purswani family continued to occupy the ancestor´s residence in Gidhwani Ghitti. Most of the male members of these families  continued with their ancestor’s occupation (goldsmithing) in Hyderabad, but before Partition of Sub-continent at least one person from each home of the family was working overseas. The members of one or two families went for higher education. Some of them became medical practitioners and teachers whereas some went into government services but most of them now, have gone back to their original occupation as Textile Merchants equipped with modern technology. In the past, some members of Purswani Family were practicing Bhakti Yoga and some were involved in community work whereas, some took part in Indian Freedom Movement and Indian National Army.

Religion and culture
Members of "Vasnani" and "Purswani" Family follow the religious customs of Bhambrai Bradri. Families of  Bhambrai Bradri are Hindu by religion, and generally follow Sindhi ways of lifestyle.

See also
Khudabad
Khudabadi Script
Panchayati Hall
Bhaiband
Khudabadi Sindhi Swarankar
Muslim conquests
Muslim conquests on the Indian subcontinent

References
English Translation

Sources
 Bherumal Mahirchand Advani, "Amilan-jo-Ahwal" - published in Sindhi, 1919
 Amilan-jo-Ahwal (1919) - translated into English in 2016 ("A History of the Amils") at sindhis
News Paper "Jog Maya" published in Sept, 1975 from Baroda (Gujarat)-Editor Naraindas Soni.

Ethnic groups in India
Lohana
Sindhi tribes
Sindhi tribes in India